Zachary Bolduc (born February 24, 2003) is a Canadian junior ice hockey centre who plays for Quebec Remparts of the Quebec Major Junior Hockey League (QMJHL) as a prospect to the St. Louis Blues in the National Hockey League (NHL).  He was selected in the first round of the 2021 NHL Entry Draft by the Blues with the 17th overall pick in the draft. He was signed to a three-year, entry-level contract with the Blues on August 24, 2021.

Career statistics

Regular season and playoffs

International

Awards and honours

References

External links
 

2003 births
Living people
Canadian ice hockey centres
Ice hockey people from Quebec
National Hockey League first-round draft picks
Quebec Remparts players
Rimouski Océanic players
Sioux City Musketeers players
Sportspeople from Trois-Rivières
St. Louis Blues draft picks